Daan Huisman (born 26 July 2002) is a Dutch professional footballer who plays as a midfielder for Eerste Divisie club VVV-Venlo, on loan from Vitesse.

Club career
Huisman played youth football for RKHVV and Vitesse, where coach Edward Sturing promoted him to the first team during  training camp in Portugal during the 2020–21 winter break. In the summer of 2020, Huisman signed his first professional contract with Vitesse until 2022.

Huisman made his professional debut on 19 September 2020 in a 2–0 home win over Sparta Rotterdam in the Eredivisie, replacing Loïs Openda in injury time. On 22 December 2020, his contract with Vitesse was extended until 2023.

On 25 November 2021, Huisman made his first start in a European game, also scoring his first professional goal in a 3–3 away draw at Rennes in the UEFA Europa Conference League group stage.

Huisman joined VVV-Venlo on a season-long loan on 31 August 2022. On 9 September 2022, Huisman scored his first ever league goal in a 5–3 away loss to Heracles Almelo in the Eerste Divisie.

International career
Huisman is a youth international for the Netherlands. Having made his international debut at under-16 level, he was called up to the Netherlands under-17 squad for the first time in September 2018, but only made his debut for the team in a 1–1 friendly draw against Spain, replacing Dirk Proper in the 75h minute.

Career statistics

Club

References

External links
 
 Daan Huisman's Netherlands U16 statistics
 Daan Huisman's Netherlands U17 statistics
 Daan Huisman at Voetbal International

2002 births
Living people
Footballers from Arnhem
Dutch footballers
Netherlands youth international footballers
Association football midfielders
SBV Vitesse players
VVV-Venlo players
Eredivisie players
Eerste Divisie players